Benavente is a town and municipality in the north of the province of Zamora , in the autonomous community Castile and León of Spain. It has about 20,000 inhabitants.

Located north of the capital on an important communications hub, it was repopulated by King Ferdinand II of León, who also awarded it law-codes (a fuero) in 1167. It was originally known as Malgrat or Malgrado.

Location 

Benavente is located in the North of Province of Zamora, in the North-West of Spain. It is 65 km away from Zamora City and 260 km from Madrid and its coordinates are 42° 0' N 5° 41' W.

The adjacent municipalities of Benavente are Villanueva de Azoague, Manganeses de la Polvorosa, Santa Cristina de la Polvorosa,  Villabrázaro, San Cristóbal de Entreviñas, Castrogonzalo, Santa Colomba de las Monjas and Arcos de la Polvorosa, all of them belonging to Province of Zamora.

Transport

Roads and Highways 

Benavente is connected to the national road network through different roads and highways:

  · Autovía Ruta de la Plata: Gijón - Oviedo - Mieres - Puerto Pajares - León - Benavente - Zamora - Salamanca - Béjar - Plasencia - Cáceres - Mérida - Sevilla.
  · Autovía del Noroeste. Madrid - Benavente - Lugo - A Coruña - Arteixo
  · Autovía de las Rías Bajas. Benavente - Sanabria - Verín - Ourense - Vigo .
 · Palencia-Benavente.

Bus Services 
Bus services are provided in the Bus Station by different companies like Alsa, Auto-Res, Empresa Vivas, Linecar or Autocares Julio Fernández.
There is a taxi stand in the Bus Station.

National lines 
Daily services to: A Coruña, Astorga, Algeciras, Asturias (Oviedo-Gijón), Ávila, Badajoz, Barcelona, Bilbao, Cáceres, Cádiz, Cangas de Narcea, Irún, La Bañeza, León, Lugo, Logroño, Málaga, Madrid, Mérida, Ourense, Monforte, Palencia, Plasencia, Ponferrada, Pontevedra, Salamanca, San Fernando, San Sebastián, Santiago de Compostela, Sevilla, Valladolid, Verín, Vigo, Villablino, Zafra, Zamora and Zaragoza.

International lines 
 Switzerland
 Germany
 Belgium
 Holland
 France - (París) 
 France (Lyon - Grenoble) 
 Andorra

Regional lines 
 Alcubilla de Nogales 
 Alija del Infantado 
 Arcos de la Polvorosa 
 Ayoo de Vidriales 
 Camarzana de Tera 
 Carracedo - 13:00
 Cubo de Benavente 
 Ferreras de Abajo 
 Milles de la Polvorosa 
 Molezuelas
 Mozar
 Puebla de Sanabria 
 Pueblica de Valverde 
 Santa Colomba de las Monjas
 Santibáñez de Vidriales
 Tábara
 Uña de Quintana
 Valle del Tera
 Valderas
 Villafáfila
 Villalpando
 Villanueva de Azoague
 Villarrín de Campos

Local Service 
Senior citizens have a free urban bus service.

Taxi 
The town has several taxi stands, one of them in the Bus Station.

Tourism

Parador
Parador de Turismo Fernando II, which occupies the Caracol Tower, a 16th-century castle with wide segmental miradors and a Mudéjar coffered ceiling in the main section

Churches
Church of Santa María de Azogue, in Romanesque style, begun in 1180. It has a Latin cross plan, with a nave and two aisles, separated by cruciform pilasters, with five apses. The nave has Gothic cross vaults added in the 16th century. The interior is home of several Gothic sculptures, such as that of the "Annunciation" (13th century)

 San Juan del Mercado Church, in Romanesque style (12th-13th centuries). It has three decorated  portals with the Adoration of the Magi, the Virgin and Child and scenes of the birth of Jesus.

Hostel

Hospital of La Piedad, an old pilgrim hostel.

Other
Hermitage of Soledad (early 16th century)
Caracol Tower

Events 

 Fiestas de la Veguilla. The local celebration in honour of the Virgen de la Vega to celebrate the torno al llamado (Monday of Pascuilla).
 Fiestas del toro enmaromado. Celebrated the day before the corpus, where the young men run (Running of the Bulls) in front of a long rope held on the horns of a bull.

Accommodation

Hotels

"Parador de Turismo Rey Fernando II de León" (H****)	Paseos de la Mota, s/n	  
"Villa de Benavente" (H ****)	Avda. de las Américas, s/n	
"Santiago" (H ***) Avda. Maragatos, 34
"Orense" (H **) C/ San Antón Viejo, 4	
"Arenas" (H *)	Ctra. de Madrid, Km 261

Hostels
"Hostal Avenida" (HS**) Avda. El Ferial, 17
"Bristol" (HS**) C/ Santa Cruz, 44.
"Universal" (HS**) C/ Sancti Spíritus, 17
"Alameda" (HS**) Autovía Madrid - Coruña km. 262
"Covadonga" (HS**) Avenida Federico Silva, 16
"Paradero 3" (HS*) Autovía Madrid – Coruña Km 261
"Paraíso" (HS *) C/ los Herreros, 64
"La Trucha" (HS) C/ la Viña, 5
"Jara" (HS) Autovía Madrid-Coruña km. 261
"Pensión La Trapería" (P) C/Agujero de San Andrés, 10

Climate 
It is characterized as a Mediterranean climate with continental characteristics due to the altitude of the municipality and its distance to the sea. The amount of winter frosts is increased, taking place even in spring, with consequential damage to some of the local agriculture.

Twin towns – sister cities

  Puebla de Zaragoza, Puebla, México.
  Vila Real, Portugal.

Dukes of Benavente

Notable people
 José Carlos Guerra, painter.
 Maria Josefa Alfonso Pîmentel Tellez Girón Borja y Centelles, fourteenth Countess and twelfth Duchess of Benavente, a patron of Goya and Boccherini
 Fray Toribio de Benavente o Motolinía (1477–1569), a missionary to Mexico
 Alonso Briceño, one of the thirteen  conquistadors led by Francisco Pizarro
 Pita Pizarro (1792–1845), a minister of Isabella II of Spain
 Francisco de Castro Pascual (1871–1949),  microbiologist
 José Nuñez Pernía (1805–1879), a Marquis of Nuñez and the first president of the Sociedad Hahnemanniana Matritense
 Pedro Nuñez Granés (1869–1944), engineer
 Celestino Alonso Rodríguez Valdespino (1828–1875),  chess player
 Federico Silva Muñoz (1923–1997), politician
 Laura Iglesias Romero, a scientist who does research for the CSIC
 Francisco José Ynduráin (1940–2008),  scientist
 Almudena Fernández (born 1977), model

Language
Regional speech is influenced by the Leonese language.

Cinemas and theatres 

 "Reina Sofía" Theatre.
 "Multicines Benavente" Cinema.

See also 

 List of municipalities in Zamora
 San Pedro De Zamudia, Zamora
 Sandin, Zamora
 Almudena Fernandez - Famous model from Benavente.

References 

Municipalities of the Province of Zamora
Astures